Sherghati is a town in the Gaya district in Bihar (formally Magadha ), India. The Morhar River surrounds it. A meteorite that came from Mars fell here on 25 August 1865; it is now kept in a London museum and is known as the Shergotty meteorite.

Sherghati was under Chero rule but during 1700 it came under the rule of Rohilla chief Azam Khan. In 1857, Raja Jehangir Bux Khan revolted against the British.

Geography 

It has an average elevation of 121 metres (396 feet).

Demographics

, Sherghati had a population of 40,666. Males constitute 52% of the population and females 42%. Sherghati has an average literacy rate of 74.3%, more than the national average of 74.04%. In Sherghati, 16% of the population is under 6 years of age.

References

Cities and towns in Gaya district